The 1292 Advanced Programmable Video System is a second-generation home video game console released by European company Audiosonic in 1978. It is part of a group of software-compatible consoles which include the Interton VC 4000 and the Voltmace Database. The 1292 Advanced Programmable Video System included its power pack inside the console instead of an exterior power pack.

Specifications

 CPU: 8-bit Signetics 2650AI at 0.887 MHz
 Programmable video interface: Signetics 2636N at 3.58 MHz. This chipset was less powerful than the later model Signetics 2637N used in the Arcadia 2001.
 Data Memory: 43 bytes

Graphics
 Sprites: 4 single colour sprites (1 can be 8 colours)
 1 score line displaying 4 BCD digits
 Background consisting of a series of alternating lines

Misc
 The early games cartridges used a 2 KByte ROM, later ones, such as Activision branded ones, up to 8 KBytes
 Very basic arcade machine sound

User programming

An expensive (£49 in the UK in 1977) Hobby Module was available which gave 6.5 kb of user-programmable memory and had a 5 pin DIN socket to allow software to be saved to a cassette tape player. This converted the unit into a halfway house between a home computer and an ordinary gaming console.

The user had to be familiar with programming in Signetics 2650 assembly language and the unconventional ways and register architecture of the Signetics 2650 processor.

Released versions
The console was produced by different companies and sold with different names. Not every console is compatible with others due to differences in the shapes and dimensions of the cartridge slots (but all of the consoles are software compatible).
Here's a table of the consoles grouped by compatibility family (due to the slots).

Games
Although, not much information is known about the release dates of the cartridges, the total number of the games should be 59 (33 games released by Radofin between 1977 and 1978, 19 games for the Interton VC 4000 and compatibles after 1978, and 7 more games released around 1980).

References

External links
 IGDB.com entry & 1292 APVS games list (With accurate explanation for misconception of the earlier 1976 release)
 SHAMELESSLIFE wordpress blog entry for details for 1292 APVS & Interton VC 4000
 Video Game Console Library entry for the 1292 APVS / VC 4000 family
 Arcade Italia entry for MAME compatibility
Museo del Videojuego Radofin 1292 and 1392 information and game list in Spanish

Home video game consoles
Second-generation video game consoles
Products introduced in 1976